Caligo oileus, the Oileus giant owl, is a butterfly of the family Nymphalidae.

The species can be found from Mexico to northern South America.

The larvae feed on Heliconia and Musa species.

Subspecies
Caligo oileus oileus (Venezuela, Colombia)
Caligo oileus scamander (Boisduval, 1870) (Colombia, Ecuador)
Caligo oileus umbratilis Stichel, 1903 (Peru)

References

 Caligo oileus at Markku Savela's Lepidoptera and Some Other Life Forms
 Oileus Owl butterfly, Learn about Butterflies
 Caligo oileus scamander, Butterflies of America

Butterflies described in 1861
Caligo
Nymphalidae of South America
Butterflies of North America
Taxa named by Baron Cajetan von Felder
Taxa named by Rudolf Felder